Gertrude Liebhart (also Gertrude Liebhardt or Trude Liebhardt, born 26 October 1928) was a retired Austrian sprint canoer who won a silver medal in the K-1 500 m event at the 1952 Olympics. She also won two medals in the K-2 500 m event at the ICF Canoe Sprint World Championships with a silver in 1950 and a bronze in 1948.

References

External links

1928 births
Possibly living people
Austrian female canoeists
Canoeists at the 1952 Summer Olympics
Olympic canoeists of Austria
Olympic silver medalists for Austria
Olympic medalists in canoeing
ICF Canoe Sprint World Championships medalists in kayak
Medalists at the 1952 Summer Olympics